Trabuco College was an American retreat center founded by Gerald Heard and Aldous Huxley early in the Human Potential Movement near the community of Trabuco Canyon, California. Although it only operated from 1942 to 1949, it is cited as an inspiration for the Esalen Institute and is now owned and operated as the Ramakrishna Monastery by the Vedanta Society of Southern California (which is part of the Ramakrishna Order of India).

References

External links
 About Vedanta - Trabuco Canyon Monastery
 Gerald Heard - official website

Buildings and structures in Orange County, California